Ernst Risch (1911–1988) was a Swiss hellenist and philologist.

He was professor of Indo-European studies at the University of Zurich

Swiss philologists
1911 births
1988 deaths
People from Zürich
20th-century philologists